Alaska Measure 2 may refer to:

1990 Alaska Measure 2, which criminalized marijuana 
1998 Alaska Measure 2, which prohibited gay marriage
2014 Alaska Measure 2, which decriminalized marijuana
2020 Alaska Measure 2, which changed Alaskan primary elections to top-four variant non-partisan blanket elections (for the statewide level only) with ranked-choice voting